Anthidium anguliventre is a species of bee in the family Megachilidae, the leaf-cutter, carder, or mason bees.

Synonyms
Synonyms for this species include:
Anthidium arabicum Pasteels, 1969
Anthidium intermedium Pasteels, 1969

References

anguliventre
Insects described in 1888